Mohd Azheem Bahari (born 13 June 1984) is a Malaysian  diver. He competed in the men's 10 metre platform event at the 2000 Summer Olympics.

References

External links
 

1984 births
Living people
Malaysian male divers
Olympic divers of Malaysia
Divers at the 2000 Summer Olympics
Place of birth missing (living people)